"Sunny Afternoon" is a song by the Kinks, written by chief songwriter Ray Davies. The track later featured on the Face to Face album as well as being the title track for their 1967 compilation album. Like its contemporary "Taxman" by the Beatles, the song references the high levels of progressive tax taken by the British Labour government of Harold Wilson. Its strong music hall flavour and lyrical focus was part of a stylistic departure for the band (begun with 1965's "A Well Respected Man"), which had risen to fame in 1964–65 with a series of hard-driving, power-chord rock hits.

Background
"Sunny Afternoon" was first written in Ray Davies' house when he was ill.

Davies said of the song's lyrics, "The only way I could interpret how I felt was through a dusty, fallen aristocrat who had come from old money as opposed to the wealth I had created for myself." In order to prevent the listener from sympathizing with the song's protagonist, Davies said, "I turned him into a scoundrel who fought with his girlfriend after a night of drunkenness and cruelty."

Davies said of the song as well as its recording:

Release and reception
Released as a single on 3 June 1966, it went to No. 1 on the UK Singles Chart on 7 July 1966, remaining there for two weeks. The track also went to No. 1 in Ireland on 14 July 1966. In America, it peaked at No. 14 on the Billboard Hot 100 pop singles chart early autumn 1966. The promotional video for the single featured the band performing in a cold, snowy environment.

Billboard praised the single's "off-beat music hall melody and up-to-date lyrics."  Cash Box said that it is a "slow-moving, blues-drenched, seasonal affair with a catchy, low-key repeating riff."  "Sunny Afternoon" was placed at No. 200 on Pitchfork Media's list of The 200 Greatest Songs of the 1960s. The song was featured in and was the title song of West End musical Sunny Afternoon. It has been covered by artists including Jimmy Buffett, Stereophonics, Michael McDonald, and Michael Caruso.

Charts and certifications

Weekly charts

Year-end charts

Certifications

Personnel
According to band researcher Doug Hinman, except where noted:

The Kinks
Ray Davies lead and backing vocals, twelve-string acoustic rhythm guitar
Dave Davies backing vocal, electric guitar
Pete Quaife bass
Mick Avory drums

Additional musicians
Rasa Davies backing vocal
Nicky Hopkins piano, melodica

References

Sources

External links
 The Official Ray Davies Web Site
 Lyrics

1966 songs
1966 singles
The Kinks songs
Jan and Dean songs
Pye Records singles
UK Singles Chart number-one singles
Irish Singles Chart number-one singles
Dutch Top 40 number-one singles
Number-one singles in Norway
Jimmy Buffett songs
Song recordings produced by Shel Talmy
Songs written by Ray Davies
Tom Jones (singer) songs
RPM Top Singles number-one singles
Reprise Records singles